The 1972 Houston Oilers season was their 13th season overall and third with the league. The team failed to improve on their previous season's output of 4–9–1, winning only one game. They missed the playoffs for the third consecutive season.

The low point of the season came in week four, a 34–0 loss on Monday Night Football to the Oakland Raiders. With the game out of hand, ABC cameras panned the stands at the Astrodome and found a man who appeared to be sleeping. When he realized the camera was on him, he shot the finger at the camera. When the camera discovered the sleeping fan, Howard Cosell intoned, “Right there, is a vivid pictureization of the excitement...”. Don Meredith shot back when the fan flipped the bird, “They’re number one in the nation!”.

Perhaps another low point for the Oilers was the final game of the season against the Cincinnati Bengals. The Oilers lost that game by a score of 61–17, the worst loss for the team in its history up to that point; exactly 17 years later, the Oilers lost 61–7 to the Bengals in Cincinnati to shatter that dubious mark. The 61 points were the second most points any NFL team had ever allowed since the merger, one fewer than the Philadelphia Eagles allowed to the New York Giants three weeks earlier.

Coincidentally, the Eagles defeated the Oilers 18–17 in the Astrodome two weeks before losing 62–10 to the Giants despite not scoring a touchdown, with Tom Dempsey connecting on six field goals.

After their win over the New York Jets 26–20 in week 3 (one week after Joe Namath threw for 496 yards and six touchdowns to defeat the Baltimore Colts), the Oilers did not win another game until week 8 of next season, when they shocked the Baltimore Colts 31–27 on the road. Sandwiched between these two games was an 18-game losing streak, which was an NFL record at the time; it was eclipsed by the 0–26 start experienced by the Tampa Bay Buccaneers in 1976 and 1977.

Offseason

NFL draft

Roster

Regular season

Preseason

Schedule

Standings

Game Summaries

Week 4: Oakland Raiders

Despite the Oilers finishing with an astounding -1 yard in net passing, this week four game on Monday Night Football had a more competitive beginning than the results showed, as Houston played strong defense early in the game. With Oakland leading just 3–0 in the first half, the Oilers had two takeaways deep in Raiders territory, but failed to score points each time. In the first quarter, Oakland's George Atkinson bobbled a punt catch right into the hands of Houston's Willie Rodgers. Rodgers took it to the end zone, but the play was brought back to the spot of the turnover, as a muffed punt recovery cannot be advanced in NFL rules. The Oilers advanced into field goal range after taking over, but were stopped there when the Raiders got away with blatantly holding TE Alvin Reed on third down. Houston tried a fake field goal, but still were left scoreless when it failed. On their ensuing drive, Oakland was forced to punt, but the Oilers blocked it on the first play of the second quarter and recovered near the goal line. Again they were held scoreless when Dan Pastorini was lifted very high into the air on a remarkable defensive play on first down, and sacked back at the 17-yard line by Gus Otto on second down. The Raiders blocked the following field goal attempt even though the placehold was only at the 29-yard line.

The trading of turnovers continued through the second quarter, as promising Raiders rookie Cliff Branch fumbled the ball away across midfield. The Oilers got into field goal range again, only to be intercepted just outside the red zone on a tipped pass over the defensive line. After trading punts a few times, Pastorini threw another interception just before halftime. The Raiders took over at the Oilers' 16-yard line with nine seconds left in the half, but scored on first down as Daryle Lamonica found Fred Biletnikoff in the right corner of the end zone for a 10–0 lead.

The first half ended on a suitably bizarre kickoff by the Raiders that hit an Oilers player at mid-field and ricocheted back to Raiders territory. Oakland gained possession, but no time remained.

The miscues kept coming in the second half. First the Oilers nearly botched receiving the second half kickoff, then the Raiders forced them to punt, only for the Raiders to muff the punt and give possession back to the Oilers. Their drive ended with the third blocked field goal of the game, which was downed all the way back at the Oilers 23-yard line. The Raiders added a field goal with this possession.

Finally, the Raiders turned the game into a blowout in the fourth quarter with touchdown passes by both Daryle Lamonica and Ken Stabler and a rushing TD by Clarence Davis. However, to the very end, neither team played a clean game. By the time it was 27–0 and Houston backup Kent Nix was put in, Houston had thrown four interceptions, Oakland had committed four fumbles, and the teams had three blocked field goals and a blocked punt combined. Nix promptly added a fifth interception upon entering the game, when his receiver stumbled. By the time of Houston's final possession, a fan was caught shooting the middle finger at the camera on the MNF broadcast.

References

Houston Oilers seasons
Houston Oilers
Houston